Mogas may refer to:

 Motor gasoline, a slang for common gasoline (for cars, motorcycles, lawnmowers ...) used by aviators to distinguish it from avgas (aviation gasoline).
 MOGAS Group, a Ugandan oil company
 Mogas 90 FC, a Beninese football club

See also 
 Moga (disambiguation)